Achgarve (Scottish Gaelic: An t-Achadh Garbh - the rough field) is a small coastal crofting and fishing hamlet, situated between Gruinard Bay and Loch Ewe on the Rubha Mòr peninsula, in the north west coast of Ross-shire, Scottish Highlands. An old track leads from Achgarve across the peninsula to the deserted village of Slaggan at Slaggan Bay to the west.
A path also leads to Mellon Udrigle to the north of Achgarve and a coastal part connects it all the way around to Slaggan and then back to Achgarve.

References

Populated places in Ross and Cromarty